Events in the year 2023 in Croatia.

Incumbents 
 President: Zoran Milanović
 Prime Minister: Andrej Plenković

Events

January 
 1 January – Croatia adopted the euro and became the 20th member state of the eurozone. This was the first enlargement of the monetary union since Lithuania's entry in 2015.

Deaths

January  
 1 January – Ferdinand Zovko, bariton and university professor (b. 1943).  
 2 January
 Zvonimir Iveković, athlete (b. 1935). 
 Ivka Dabetić, actress (b. 1936).
 3 January – Mirko Zelić, academic and scientist (b. 1936). 
 5 January – Željko Kućan, academic and biochemist (b. 1934). 
 8 January – Martin Semenčić, sound designer and film editor (b. 1980).
 10 January – Fabijan Lovrić, poet (b. 1953). 
 16 January – Miro Glavurtić, painter, writer and mystic (b. 1932).

References 

 
Croatia
Croatia
2020s in Croatia
Years of the 21st century in Croatia